La Voz Senior (Spanish for The Voice Senior) is a Mexican reality talent show that premiered on July 15, 2019 on Azteca Uno. It is based on and part of The Voice franchise created by television producer John de Mol.

When TV Azteca the acquired the format of La Voz in 2019 from Televisa, they announced they would also produce La Voz Senior, for elders over 55.

Format 

The show consists of three phases: Blind audition, Knockout phase, and Finale. Four judges/coaches, all noteworthy recording artists, choose teams of contestants through a blind audition process (6 members in season 1 and 12 members in season 2).

First Phase – The Blind Auditions 

Each judge has the length of the auditioner's performance (about one minute) to decide if he or she wants that singer on his or her team; if two or more judges want the same singer (as happens frequently), the singer has the final choice of coach.

Second Phase – The Knockouts 

In this phase two artists from the same team sing an individual song and their coach chooses the winner. In the Senior format, no steals are available.

Third Phase – The Finale 

In the Finale, each artist competes to receive their coach’s and public’s vote. The artist with the highest votes from each team advances to the next round. In the last round, the highest voted artist wins the title as their country’s The Voice 'Senior', along with their coach.

Coaches and hosts
The first season features Ricardo Montaner, Belinda, Yahir and Lupillo Rivera as coaches, and Jimena Pérez as host, same as season eight of the adult version. Filming for the second season began in September 2020, revealing Belinda, Montaner, Yahir returning as coaches, joined by María José, replacing Rivera. Pérez also was replaced in the second season by Eddy Vilard.

Coaches' teams 

 – Winning coach/contestant
 – Runner-up coach/contestant
 – Third place coach/contestant
 – Fourth place coach/contestant

Series overview

Season 1

Season 2

References

The Voice (franchise)